Stuart Oliver may refer to:

 Stuart Oliver (cricketer) (born 1972), Australian cricketer
 Stuart Oliver (racing driver) (born 1963), British auto racing driver